Epichloë sylvatica is a haploid sexual species in the fungal genus Epichloë. 

A systemic and seed-transmissible grass symbiont first described in 1998,  Epichloë sylvatica forms a clade within the Epichloë typhina complex.

Epichloë sylvatica is found from Europe to Asia, where it has been identified in association with two grass species, Brachypodium sylvaticum and Hordelymus europaeus.

Subspecies
Epichloë sylvatica has one subspecies, Epichloë sylvatica subsp. pollinensis Leuchtm. & M. Oberhofer.  Described in 2013, Epichloë sylvatica subsp. pollinensis has been found in Europe in the grass species Hordelymus europaeus.

References 

sylvatica
Fungi described in 1998
Fungi of Asia
Fungi of Europe